Crocidopoma is a genus of land snails with an operculum, terrestrial gastropod mollusks in the family Neocyclotidae.

Species 
Species within the genus Crocidopoma include:
 Crocidopoma gunglachi Torre & Bartsch, 1942
 Crocidopoma perdistinctum (Gundlach, 1858)

References 

Neocyclotidae